Cheluvi is a 1992 Kannada film directed by Girish Karnad. The film stars Girish Karnad and Sonali Kulkarni in her film debut. This film won the National Film Award for Best Film on Environment Conservation/Preservation. This film is based on the tale of A Flowering Tree: A Woman's Tale. Although the film was shot in Kannada, it contains Hindi songs. The film was released with English subtitles and was dubbed in Hindi upon release. The film was later included in the 24th International Film Festival in Delhi.

Plot 
Two sisters sell blossoms to the villagers who wonder where the flowers came from. One of the sisters, Cheluvi, is told by the other sister to reveal the secret and in turn she turns into a half human half tree being.

Cast 
 Girish Karnad as Village Headman
 Sonali Kulkarni as Cheluvi
 Prashant Rao as Kumar
 Gargi Yakkundi as Shyama

Production 
Rajiv Menon was chosen as the film's cinematographer after collaborating with Girish Karnad for several documentaries.

References 

Films directed by Girish Karnad
1990s Kannada-language films